This is a list of displayed Mikoyan-Gurevich MiG-23s.

Aircraft on display

Belgium 

 4421 (Egyptian Air Force) painted as 23 Red (Soviet Air Force) – MiG-23BN on static display at the Royal Museum of the Armed Forces and Military History in Brussels.
 20+59 (German Air Force) – MiG-23UB on static display at the Belgian Military Radio and Communications Museum in Bessemer, Limburg.

Bulgaria 
 867 – MiG-23MLA on static display at the National Museum of Military History in Sofia.
 870 – MiG-23MLA on static display at the National Museum of Military History in Sofia.
 26 – MiG-23UB on static display at the National Museum of Military History in Sofia.
 29 – MiG-23UB on static display at the National Museum of Military History in Sofia.

Canada 
 4857 (Czech Air Force) – MiG-23ML on display at Air Defence Museum of Canadian Forces Base Bagotville in La Baie, Quebec. This airframe was donated to the museum by the Czech Republic.

China 
 9501 – (Egyptian Air Force) MiG-23MS on static display at the Chinese Aviation Museum in Beijing, Beijing.

Czech Republic 
 3646 – MiG-23MF on static display at the Prague Aviation Museum in Prague.
 4850 – MiG-23ML on static display at Caslav Chotusice Airport in Chotusice, Central Bohemia.
 9825 – MiG-23BN on static display at the Prague Aviation Museum in Prague.
 5733 – MiG-23BN on static display at Caslav Chotusice Airport in Chotusice, Central Bohemia.
 7905 – MiG-23UB on static display at the Prague Aviation Museum in Prague.

Denmark 

 010 (Polish Air Force) – MiG-23MF on static display at the Cold War Museum Langelandsfort in Bagenkop, Langeland.

Estonia 
 32 Blue (Ukrainian Air Force) – MiG-23MLD on static display at the Estonian Aviation Museum in Lange, Tartu.

France 
 3887 (Czech Air Force) – MiG-23MF on static display at the Musee des Avions de Chasse in Savigny-lès-Beaune, Burgundy.
 20+30 (German Air Force) – MiG-23ML on static display at the Musée de l’air et de l’espace in Le Bourget, Île-de-France.

Germany 

 08 Red (Soviet Air Force) – MiG-23S on static display at the Luftfahrtmuseum Finowfurt in Eberswalde, Brandenburg.
 20+01 – MiG-23MF on static display at the Flugausstellung Hermeskeil in Hermeskeil, Rhineland-Palatinate.
 20+04 – MiG-23MF on static display at the Flugplatzmuseum Cottbus in Cottbus, Brandenburg.
 20+05 – MiG-23MF on static display at the Technikmuseum Hugo Junkers in Dessau-Roßlau, Saxony-Anhalt.
 20+02 – MiG-23MF on static display at the Luftwaffenmuseum der Bundeswehr in Berlin.
 20+10 – MiG-23ML on static display at the Interessenverein Luftfahrt Neuenkirchen in Neuenkirchen, Mecklenburg-Vorpommern.
 20+19 – MiG-23ML on static display at the Flugausstellung Hermeskeil in Hermeskeil, Rhineland-Palatinate.
 20+11 – MiG-23ML on static display at Rostock–Laage Airport in Rostock, Mecklenburg-Vorpommern.
 20+13 – MiG-23ML on static display at the Luftwaffenmuseum der Bundeswehr in Berlin.
 332 (East German Air Force) – MiG-23ML on static display at the Luftfahrttechnischen Museum in Rechlin, Mecklenburg-Vorpommern. This airframe was previously on display at the Historical Technical Museum, Peenemünde.
 20+39 – MiG-23BN on static display at the Technik Museum Speyer in Speyer, Rhineland-Palatinate.
 20+46 – MiG-23BN on static display at the Flugausstellung Hermeskeil in Hermeskeil, Rhineland-Palatinate.
 20+47 – MiG-23BN on static display at the Deutsches Museum Flugwerft Schleissheim in Munich, Bavaria.
 20+51 – MiG-23BN on static display at the Luftwaffenmuseum der Bundeswehr in Berlin.
 20+55 – MiG-23BN on static display at the Luftfahrtmuseum Finowfurt in Eberswalde, Brandenburg.
 20+49 – MiG-23BN on static display at the Technik Museum Speyer in Speyer, Rhineland-Palatinate.
 20+62 – MiG-23UB on static display at the Flugplatzmuseum Cottbus in Cottbus, Brandenburg.
 20+63 – MiG-23UB on static display at the Luftwaffenmuseum der Bundeswehr in Berlin.
 20+57 – MiG-23UB on static display at the Luftfahrtmuseum Finowfurt in Eberswalde, Brandenburg.

Hungary 
 20 – MiG-23UB on static display at the Military Museum and Technology Park in Kecel, Bacs-Kiskun.
 06 – MiG-23MF on static display at the Airplane Museum of Szolnok in Szolnok, Jász-Nagykun-Szolnok.
 15 – MiG-23UB on static display at the Airplane Museum of Szolnok in Szolnok, Jász-Nagykun-Szolnok.

India 

 Mig-23BN-SK-247 on display at Amrita University, Coimbatore, Tamil Nadu in the Department of Aerospace Engineering's Lab.
 MiG-23 on display at Hindustan University in Chennai, Tamil Nadu.
 MiG-23 on display at Air Force Quarters in Mumbai, Maharashtra.
 MiG-23BN on static display at Visvesvaraya National Institute of Technology in Nagpur, Maharashtra.
 MiG-23BN on static display at the University of Petroleum & Energy Studies in Dehradun, Uttarakhand. This airframe was donated by the Indian Air Force and came from Halwara Airbase.
 SM217 - MiG-23BN on static display at Aligarh Muslim University in Aligarh, Uttar Pradesh.
 SM202 - MiG-23BN on static display at the National Institute of Technology, Tiruchirappalli in Tiruchirappalli, Tamil Nadu.
 MiG-23BN on static display at the National War Memorial Southern Command in Pune Cantonment, Maharashtra.
 SM268 - MiG-23BN on static display at Guru Nanak Dev University in Amritsar, Punjab.
 SM219 - MiG-23BN on static display at Sainik School, Kapurthala in Kapurthala, Punjab.
 MiG-23BN on static display at Pushpa Gujral Science City near Kapurthala, Punjab.
 MiG-23BN on static display at Halwara Air Force Station in Halwara, Punjab.
 SM262 - MiG-23BN on static display at Maintenance Command Headquarters in Nagar, Maharashtra.
 MiG-23UM on static display at an army cantonment in Jorhat, Assam.
 MiG-23MF on static display at Sainik School, Satara in Satara, Maharashtra.
 MiG-23 on static display near Military area in Kolhapur, Maharashtra.
SK419 - MiG-23MF on static display at 11 Base Repair Depot in Ozar, Maharashtra.
SK401 - MiG-23MF on static display at Army Institute of Physical Training in Pune, Maharashtra.
SK423 - MiG-23MF on static display at Kamalnayan Bajaj Park in Pune, Maharashtra.
 MiG-23 on static display at Pimpri Chinchwad Science Park in Pune, Maharashtra.
 SK403 – MiG-23 on static display at Ujjain Engineering College in Ujjain, Madhya Pradesh.
 MiG-23 on static display at Government College in Nattakom, Kerala.

Israel 
 2786 (Syrian Air Force) – MiG-23ML on static display at the Israeli Air Force Museum in Hatzerim, South District.

Lithuania 
 05 Yellow (Ukrainian Air Force) - MiG-23MLD on static display at Istros Aviapark in Stanioniai, Panevėžys.

Poland 
 120 – MiG-23MF on static display at the Polish Aviation Museum in Krakow.

Russia 

 MiG-23S on static display at the Central Armed Forces Museum in Moscow.
 0390206625 – MiG-23ML in storage in unrestored condition at the Central Air Force Museum in Monino, Moscow.
 0390325365 – MiG-23ML in storage in unrestored condition at the Central Air Force Museum in Monino, Moscow.
 MiG-23 on static display at the Central Air Force Museum in Monino, Moscow.
 MiG-23 on static display at the Central Air Force Museum in Monino, Moscow.

Serbia 
 MiG-23 on static display at the Belgrade Aviation Museum in Surčin, Belgrade.

Spain 
 20+12 (German Air Force) – MiG-23ML on static display at the Museo del Aire in Madrid.

Ukraine 
 54 Red – MiG-23ML on static display at the Ukraine State Aviation Museum in Kyiv.
 84 White – MiG-23UB on static display at the Ukraine State Aviation Museum in Kyiv.

United Kingdom 
 04 Red (Soviet Air Force) painted as 458 of Polish Air Force – MiG-23M on static display at the Newark Air Museum in Winthorpe, Nottinghamshire.

United States 

 44 White (Soviet Air Force) – MiG-23MLD on static display at the Pima Air and Space Museum in Tucson, Arizona.
 20+25 (German Air Force) – MiG-23ML on static display at the Threat Training Facility at Nellis Air Force Base in North Las Vegas, Nevada.
 MiG-23BM on static display at the Threat Training Facility at Nellis Air Force Base in North Las Vegas, Nevada
 20+20 (German Air Force) – MiG-23ML on static display at Goodfellow Air Force Base in San Angelo, Texas.
 20+16 (German Air Force) – MiG-23ML on static display at the Evergreen Aviation & Space Museum in McMinnville, Oregon.
 20+23 (German Air Force) – MiG-23ML on static display at Naval Air Station Fallon in Fallon, Nevada.
 5744 (Czech Air Force) – MiG-23BN on static display at March Field Air Museum in Riverside, California. This airframe was formerly operated by the Czechoslovakian Air Force.
 MiG-23MLD in storage at the National Museum of the United States Air Force in Dayton, Ohio.
 MiG-23MS on static display at the National Museum of the United States Air Force in Dayton, Ohio.
 203 (Bulgarian Air Force) - MiG-23MLD on static display at the Texas Air Museum, Slaton, Texas.
 211 (Bulgarian Air Force) - MiG-23MLD Stored at Hutchinson County Airport, Borger, Texas.
 217 (Bulgarian Air Force) - MiG-23MLD on static display at Wings Over the Rockies Air and Space Museum in Denver, Colorado.

References

External links 

 MiG-23 in Poland – Militarne Podroze

MiG-23s